Benedict Bonaventura Zhang Xin (23 October 1911 – 10 September 1999) was a Chinese Catholic priest and bishop of the Roman Catholic Archdiocese of Taiyuan from 1981 to 1994.

Biography
Zhang was born in Taiyuan, Shanxi, on 23 October 1911. He joined the Franciscans in 1931. He was ordained a priest in 1937. He graduated from Fu Jen Catholic University.

During the ten-year Cultural Revolution, Zhang was sent to the May Seventh Cadre Schools to do farm works.

In 1981, Zhang was consecrated as bishop of the Roman Catholic Archdiocese of Taiyuan by Joseph Zong Huaide, the zhen president of the Catholic Patriotic Association. He retired in 1994.

Zhang died of an illness on 10 September 1999, at the age of 87.

References

1911 births
1999 deaths
People from Taiyuan
Fu Jen Catholic University alumni
Chinese Roman Catholic bishops